The men's road race at the 2002 UCI Road World Championships was the 69th edition of the event. The race took place on Sunday 13 October 2002 based around the Circuit Zolder, Belgium. The race was won by Mario Cipollini of Italy.

Final classification

References

Men's Road Race
UCI Road World Championships – Men's road race